Cayo Icacos is a small, uninhabited island off the coast of Fajardo, Puerto Rico. It forms part of the La Cordillera Reef Nature Reserve and is under the jurisdiction of the Department of Natural Resources and Environment. It is a fifteen-minute water taxi ride from Fajardo. The island is a popular snorkeling and beach tourism destination.

For some time, there was a limestone quarry on the southern part of the island, with a short railroad system to shuttle limestone from the quarry to the pier.

See also
 List of islands of Puerto Rico

References

External links
 *Biobay Fajardo

Cays and islets of Puerto Rico
Fajardo, Puerto Rico
Uninhabited islands of Puerto Rico